This list of 2007 motorsport champions is a list of national or international touring auto racing series with a Championship decided by the points or positions earned by a driver from multiple races.

Open wheel racing

Kart
 Kart racing
 Superkart
 Australian Superkart Championship
250 International Warren McIlveen 
250 National Jason McIntyre 
125 Gearbox Kristian Stebbing 
FIA-CIK European Superkart Championship
Gavin Bennett 
MSA British Superkart Championship
Trevor Roberts 
 BSA National Championship
Div. 1 Superkarts
Paul Kennings 
Div. 2 Superkarts
Gavin Bennett 
F125 Open
Mark Bramhall 
F125ICC
Danny Edwards 
F250 Clubman Challenge
Nathan Fearon 
F250 National Superstock Challenge
Nick Hull 
F250 National Masters
Jason Dredge 
F125 ICC Masters
Ian Larder 
Championnat de France Superkart
Damien Payart 
U.S. Superkart Championship
Intercontinental E championship
Andy Kiker 
Formula E Championship
Johnny West

Rally car
 World Rally Championship:2007 World Rally Championship
Sébastien Loeb 
Manufacturers: Ford 
 Junior World Rally Championship (JWRC)
Per-Gunnar Andersson 
 Production World Rally Championship (PWRC)
Toshihiro Arai 
 African Rally Championship
Conrad Rautenbach 
 Asia-Pacific Rally Championship
Cody Crocker 
 European Rally Championship
Simon Jean-Joseph 
 Intercontinental Rally Challenge
Enrique Garcia Ojeda 
 Middle East Rally Championship
Nasser Al-Attiyah 
Manufacturer: Subaru 
1600cc: Ahmad Al Kharras 
 Russian Rally Championship
Evgeny Vertunov 
 Australian Rally Championship
Simon Evans 
 Austrian Rally Championship
Raimund Baumschlager 
 Belgian Rally Championship
Larry Cols 
 British Rally Championship
Guy Wilks 
 Canadian Rally Championship
Antoine L'Estage 
 Finnish Rally Championship
Group A: Jussi Välimäki 
Group N: Jari Ketomaa 
Group n: Joonas Lindroos 
 FFSA French Rally Championship
Jean-Marie Cuoq 
 German Rally Championship
Hermann Gassner 
 Italian Rally Championship
Giandomenico Basso 
 All Japan Rally Championship
Norihiko Katsuta 
 Portuguese Rally Championship
Bruno Magalhães 
 Spanish Rally Championship
Dani Solà 
 China Rally Championship
4WD: Subaru Rally Team 
2WD NA2000: Shanghai Volkswagen 333 Racing

Off-road racing
FIA Cross Country Rally World Cup
Carlos Sainz 
Production: Riccardo Garosci 
2WD Class: Dominique Housieaux 
Teams: Volkswagen Motorsport
FIA International Cup for Cross-Country Bajas
Boris Gadasin 
International Cup for Cross-Country Bajas T2
Hamad Bin Eid Al Thani 
Championship Off-Road Racing
Pro-4: Carl Renezeder 
Pro-2: Jerry Whelchel 
Pro-Lite: Rob Haughton 
Super Buggy: Larry Foddrill 
Single Buggy: Bryce Menzies 
World Series of Off-Road Racing
PRO 4x4: Johnny Greaves 
PRO 2WD: Scott Taylor 
PRO Light: Chad Hord 
Super Stock Truck: Dan Baudoux 
Super Buggy: Gary Nierop 
Stock Truck: Scott Beauchamp 
1600 Buggy: John Fitzgerald 
1600 Light Buggy: Jamie Kleikamp 
Formula Off-Road
World Championship
Finn Erik Løberg 
Unlimited Class:Finn Erik Løberg 
Modified Street Class:Ingvar Arason 
Icelandic Championship
Gunnar Gunnarsson 
Unlimited Class:Gunnar Gunnarsson 
Modified Street Class:Ragnar Róbertsson 
Street Legal Class:Páll Pálsson

Sports car racing
 FIA GT Championship:2007 FIA GT Championship season
GT1: Thomas Biagi 
GT1 Teams: Vitaphone Racing 
GT1 Manufacturers: Maserati 
GT2: Dirk Müller 
GT2: Toni Vilander 
GT2 Teams: AF Corse 
GT2 Manufacturers: Ferrari 
Citation Cup: Ben Aucott 
 FIA GT3 European Championship
Henri Moser 
Gilles Vannelet 
Teams: Martini Callaway Racing 
 FIA GT4 European Cup
Eric De Doncker 
 Le Mans Series:2007 Le Mans Series season
LMP1: Pedro Lamy 
LMP1: Stéphane Sarrazin 
LMP1 Teams: Team Peugeot Total 
LMP2: Thomas Erdos 
LMP2: Mike Newton 
LMP2 Teams: Ray Mallock Ltd. 
GT1: Soheil Ayari 
GT1: Stéphane Ortelli 
GT1 Teams: Oreca 
GT2: Robert Bell 
GT2 Teams: Virgo Motorsport 
 American Le Mans Series:2007 American Le Mans Series season
P1: Rinaldo Capello 
P1: Allan McNish 
P1 Teams: Audi Sport North America 
P2: Timo Bernhard 
P2: Romain Dumas 
P2 Teams: Penske Motorsports 
GT1: Olivier Beretta 
GT1: Oliver Gavin 
GT1 Teams: Corvette Racing 
GT2: Jaime Melo 
GT2: Mika Salo 
GT2 Teams: Risi Competizione 
 International GT Open
Richard Lietz 
Joël Camathias 
GTA: Andrea Montermini 
GTA: Michele Maceratesi 
GTS: Riccardo Romagnoli 
GTB: Gianni Giudici 
 ADAC GT Masters
Christopher Haase 
 Australian GT Championship:2007 Australian GT Championship season
Allan Simonsen 
 Belcar
Bart Couwberghs 
Div. 1: Maxime Soulet 
Div. 1: Guillaume Dumarey 
Div. 2: Bart Couwberghs 
Div. 3: Hans Thiers 
Div. 3: Frank Thiers 
 Brazil GT3 Championship
Alexandre Negrão 
Andreas Mattheis 
 British GT Championship:2007 British GT season
Alex Mortimer 
Bradley Ellis 
GTC: Jamie Smyth 
GTC: Graeme Mundy 
 Dutch Supercar Challenge
GT: Ardi van der Hoek 
GT: Robert van der Zwan 
SS1: Peter van der Kolk 
SS2: Tony Brown 
SS2: Ian White 
Sport: Kees Kreijne 
 Peroni Promotion Endurance GT Series
GT Special: Fabio Valle 
GT Serie: "Yah-Man" 
GT Cup: Roberto Fecchio 
GT Cup: Dario Paletto 
 FFSA GT Championship
GT1: Raymond Narac 
GT1: Soheil Ayari 
GT2: Michel Lecourt 
GT2: Richard Balandras 
GT3: Christopher Campbell 
 Italian GT Championship
Stefano Livio 
Lorenzo Casè 
GT3A: Giacomo Piccini 
GT3A: Giovanni Berton 
GT3B: Marco Coldani 
Cup: Angelo Proietti 
 Japan Le Mans Challenge:2007 Japan Le Mans Challenge season
LMP1: Hideki Noda 
LMP1: Shinsuke Yamazaki 
LMP1 Teams: Hitotsuyama Racing 
LMP2: Masaru Tomizawa 
LMP2: Yuuji Asou 
LMP2: Tsubasa Kurosawa 
LMP2 Teams: AIM Sports 
 Rolex Sports Car Series:2007 Rolex Sports Car Series season
DP: Alex Gurney 
DP: Jon Fogarty 
GT: Dirk Werner 
 Spanish GT Championship
Peter Sundberg 
Domingo Romero 
GTA: Peter Sundberg 
GTA: Domingo Romero 
GTB: José Manuel Pérez-Aicart 
GTB: Oscar Fernández 
 SCCA Speed GT World Challenge
Randy Pobst 
 Super GT:2007 Super GT season
GT500: Daisuke Ito 
GT500: Ralph Firman 
GT500 Teams: Honda Racing ARTA 
GT300: Kazuya Oshima 
GT300: Hiroaki Ishiura 
GT300 Teams: Privée KENZO Asset Shiden 
 V de V Challenge
Proto: Rob Croydon 
GT-Touring: Pierre Benoist 
GT-Touring: Jean-Paul Pagny 
 VLN
Marco Wolf 
Jürgen Fritzsche 
Heinz-Otto Fritzsche

Stock car
 NASCAR
 NEXTEL Cup:2007 NASCAR Nextel Cup Series
Jimmie Johnson 
 Busch Series:2007 NASCAR Busch Series
Carl Edwards 
 Craftsman Truck Series:2007 NASCAR Craftsman Truck Series
Ron Hornaday Jr. 
American Speed Association
ASA Late Model Series
Travis Dassow
Argentinian Turismo Carretera
Christian Ledesma 
Automobile Racing Club of America
ARCA RE/MAX Series:2007 in ARCA Remax Series
Frank Kimmel 
ARCA Lincoln Welders Truck Series
Bill Withers 
Champion Racing Association
CRA Super Series
Chris Gabehart  
Stock Car Brasil
Copa Nextel: Cacá Bueno 
Stock Car Light: Norberto Gresse Filho 
Stock Junior: Jason Oliveira 
World Championship Series
Rey Gumatas

Touring car
 World Touring Car Championship:2007 World Touring Car Championship season
Andy Priaulx 
Manufacturers: BMW 
Yokohama Independents Trophy: Stefano D'Aste 
Yokohama Independents Teams: Proteam Motorsport 
 European Touring Car Cup
Michel Nykjær 
Superproduction: Aleksey Basov 
 Asian Touring Car Series
Fariqe Hairuman 
 Argentinian TC 2000 Championship
Matías Rossi 
 V8 Supercars:2007 V8 Supercar season
Garth Tander 
 Fujitsu V8 Supercars Series
Tony D'Alberto 
 Australian Sports Sedan Championship:2007 Australian Sports Sedan Series
Tony Ricciardello 
 Belgian Touring Car Series
Damien Coens 
Steve van Bellingen 
 British Touring Car Championship:2007 British Touring Car Championship season
Fabrizio Giovanardi 
Teams: SEAT Sport UK 
Manufacturers: Vauxhall 
Independents: Colin Turkington 
Teams: Team RAC 
 Danish Touring Car Championship
Michel Nykjær 
 Deutsche Tourenwagen Masters:2007 Deutsche Tourenwagen Masters season
Mattias Ekström 
 ADAC Procar Series:2007 ADAC Procar-Serie Season
Franz Engstler 
Div. 2: Thomas Mühlenz 
Div. 2: Kai Jordan 
 Peroni Promotion Italian Touring Car Competition
Cesare Cremonesi 
 Peroni Promotion Endurance Touring Car Series
Tiziano Capelletti 
Federico Della Volta 
 Superstars Series
Gianni Morbidelli 
International Series: Giuliano Alessi 
 Koni Challenge
Grand Sport: Jeff Segal 
Grand Sport: Jep Thornton 
Street Tourer: Adam Burrows 
Street Tourer: Trevor Hopwood 
 New Zealand V8s
John McIntyre 
 Portuguese Touring Car Championship
César Campaniço 
 Bridgestone Production Car Championship
Shaun Watson-Smith
Class A:Shaun Watson-Smith 
Class T:Iain Pepper 
Class B:Ben Morgenrood 
Class C:Robi Beninca 
 WesBank V8 Supercars
Hennie Groenewald 
 SCCA Speed Touring Car World Challenge
Jeff Altenburg 
 Super Taikyu
ST1: Endless Advan Z 
ST2: Öhlins Racing 
ST3: Karura Sports 
ST4: Team Honda Access 
 Swedish Touring Car Championship:2007 STCC Season
Fredrik Ekblom 
Caran Cup: Joakim Frid 
 China Circuit Championship
Shanghai Volkswagen 333 Racing

Drag racing
National Hot Rod Association (NHRA)
NHRA POWERade Drag Racing Series
Top Fuel Dragster
Tony Schumacher 
Top Fuel Funnycar
Tony Pedregon 
Pro Stock
Jeg Coughlin Jr. 
Lucas Oil Drag Racing Series
NHRA Xplōd Sport Compact Racing Series
Pro RWD
Brad Personett
Pro FWD
Gary Gardella
Modified
Brent Rau
Hot Rod
Kenny Tran
All Motor
Norris Prayoonto
Sport RWD
(West):Darin Dichiara
(East): Ali Afshar
Sport FWD
(East):Fernando Reyes
(West):Cortney Green
Street Stock
(East):Christian Gomez Castillo
(West):Jeremy Nicolodemos
Quick 16
(East):Brian Ballard
(West):Karl Martin
International Hot Rod Association (IHRA)
 Knoll Gas-Torco TF
Bruce Litton
 Knoll Gas-Torco Nitro FC
Dale Creasy Jr
Torco Comp Plus Pro Mod
Scott Cannon Jr
Alcohol Funny Car
Mark Thomas
Torco Comp Plus Pro Stock
Robert Patrick Jr
Top Sportsman
Jason Lynch
Top Dragster
Jeff Brown
Super Stock
Anthony Bertozzi
Stock
Anthony Bertozzi
Quick Rod
Danny Earl Waters Jr
Super Rod
Brian Folk
Hot Rod
Damien Hazelton
Summit Racing Equipment All Stars
Jason Lynch
FIA Drag Racing
Pro Modified
Michael Gullqvist 
Pro Stock
Jimmy Alund 
Top Fuel
Urs Erbacher 
Top Methanol Dragster
Dave Wilson 
Top Methanol Funny Car
Fredrik Fagerstrom 
MSA Drag Racing
Pro Modified
Andy Robinson

Drifting
 Drifting
 D1 Grand Prix:2007 D1 Grand Prix season
Masato Kawabata 
D1SL:Kazuya Matsukawa 
 Formula D:
Tanner Foust 
Team Drift:Team Retaks 
 MSC Challenge
Singles:A. Fujio 
Triple Class:N. Nakamura , A. Fujio , K. Usehima 
 European Drift Championship:
Brett Castle 
 D1NZ:
Carl Ruiterman 
 Prodrift Irish Series:
Eric O'Sullivan 
 Nordic Drifting Championship
Fredric Aasbo

Hillclimbing
Hillclimbing
FIA European Hillclimb Cup
Georg Plasa 
FIA European Hill Climb Championship
Category 1:Peter Jurena SK
Category 2:Ander Vilariño 
FIA International Hill Climb Challenge
Laszlo Hernadi
Championnat de France de la Montagne
Lionel Régal 
British Hill Climb Championship
Martin Groves 
Australian Hillclimb Championship
Peter Gumley

One-make series
 Ferrari Challenge
 Ferrari Challenge Europa
Trofeo Pirelli: Michael Cullen 
Coppa Shell: Lloyd La Marca 
Dealers Cup: Kessel Racing 
 Ferrari Challenge Italia
Trofeo Pirelli: Vito Postiglione 
Coppa Shell: Giorgio Massazza 
Coppa Concessionarie: Rossocorsa 
 Ferrari Challenge North America
Mike Zoi 
 Ferrari Challenge Scandinavia
Jari Nurminen 
 Porsche Supercup
Richard Westbrook 
 Carrera Cup Asia
 Tim Sugden 
 Carrera Cup Australia: 2007 Australian Carrera Cup Championship
 David Reynolds 
 Carrera Cup Deutschland
 Uwe Alzen 
 Carrera Cup France
 Patrick Pilet 
 Porsche Carrera Cup Great Britain
 James Sutton 
 Carrera Cup Italia
 Andrea Boldrini 
 Carrera Cup Japan
 Shinichi Takagi 
 Porsche Carrera Cup Scandinavia
 Edward Sandström 
 Radical World Cup
Gonçalo Araújo 
SR8: Tim Greaves 
SR3: Gonçalo Araújo 
SR4: Toby Newton 
 Eurocup Mégane Trophy
Pedro Petiz 
 Supercopa SEAT León
Germany: Thomas Marschall 
Spain: José Manuel Pérez-Aicart 
UK: Jonathan Adam

Other
 Trophée Andros
Alain Prost

Sources
 Driver Database list of 2007 championship winners

See also
 List of motorsport championships
 List of 2007 motorcycling champions
 Auto racing

 Champions
2007